The Friedline Apartments in Boise, Idaho, is a Queen Anne style apartment building designed by Ross Cartee and constructed in 1902. The sandstone and brick building features a -round turret at the corner of W State and 14th Streets. The building was listed on the National Register of Historic Places in 1982. 

When the building opened in 1902, it contained eight 2-story apartments, each with six rooms and "neat porticos over the entrance to each pair of houses."

Abraham Friedline
Dr. Abraham Friedline (May 8, 1848-April 29, 1914) was a dentist who moved to Boise in 1897 and opened the Denver Dental Parlors. He also invested in real estate and mining companies.

References

External links
 
 Dr. Abraham Friedline, Progressive Men of Southern Idaho (A.W. Bowen & Co., 1904), pp 827

		
National Register of Historic Places in Boise, Idaho
Queen Anne architecture in Idaho
Residential buildings completed in 1904
Apartment buildings in Boise, Idaho
Apartment buildings on the National Register of Historic Places in Idaho